HM Pitje Stadium is a multi-purpose stadium located in Mamelodi, a suburb of the City of Tshwane, South Africa. It is currently used mostly for football matches and is set to be utilized as a training field for teams participating in the 2010 FIFA World Cup after being renovated in 2009 and brought up to FIFA standards. Mamelodi Sundowns stopped using the stadium for its home games long before renovations. The Team management moved the team to 
loftus versfeld. The previous owners tried by all means to detach the team to the people of Mamelodi by changing the team from Mamelodi Sundowns to just Sundowns.

In the past, it was the part-time home stadium of the Mamelodi Sundowns, who now play at the Loftus Versfeld Stadium.

The stadium was named after Hezekiel Mothibe Pitje, the first mayor of Mamelodi.

References

Soccer venues in South Africa
Multi-purpose stadiums in South Africa
Sports venues in Gauteng
City of Tshwane Metropolitan Municipality